KPRF is a futsal club based in Moscow, Russia. It was founded in 2003. Since 2011–12, KPRF competes in the Russian Super League. The club is named after the Communist Party of the Russian Federation (KPRF), and was founded in 2003 initially as a fun club for a competition (which KPRF won) which included clubs representing different political parties of Russia.

Current squad

Achievements
KPRF
 Russian Futsal Super League
 Winners: 2019/2020
 Runner-up: 2018/2019, 2021/2022
 UEFA Futsal Champions League
 Third place: 2019/2020
 Russian Higher League
 Winners: 2010/2011

KPRF-2
 Russian Higher League
 Winners: 2016/2017, 2017/2018, 2020/2021, 2021/2022

League results

See also 
 Communist Party of the Russian Federation

References

External links
MFC KPRF

2003 establishments in Russia
Futsal clubs established in 2003
Futsal clubs in Russia
Organizations associated with the Communist Party of the Russian Federation